The MRWA A class was a class of steam locomotives built by Kitson & Co. in Leeds, England, for the Midland Railway of Western Australia (MRWA).  The class's wheel arrangement was 2-8-2.

Service history 
The first three members of the A class, nos A21–A23, entered service in 1926. Two further batches of A class units followed, nos A24–A26 in 1927 and A27–A29 in 1929.

Withdrawals began in 1957, with A25 being the first to go.  The others were withdrawn in 1958, and all were sold and cut up for scrap in 1959.

See also 
 List of Western Australian locomotive classes
 Locomotives of the Western Australian Government Railways

References

External links

Kitson locomotives
Railway locomotives introduced in 1926
A class
2-8-2 locomotives
3 ft 6 in gauge locomotives of Australia
Locomotives of the Midland Railway of Western Australia
Scrapped locomotives
Freight locomotives